Banco Nacional was a bank from Brazil. It was taken over by Unibanco in 1995.

The Nacional brand is better known as main sponsor of Ayrton Senna during most of his racing career in Formula One (1984-1994).

The TV Globo's popular news program Jornal Nacional was originally had the bank as the main sponsor.

References

Nacional, Banco
Nacional, Banco
Banks established in 1944
Economy of Belo Horizonte